Viktor Felixovich Vekselberg (born April 14, 1957) is a Ukrainian-born Russian–Israeli-Cypriot oligarch, billionaire, and businessman. He is the owner and president of Renova Group, a Russian conglomerate. According to Forbes, as of November 2021, his fortune is estimated at $9.3 billion, making him the 262nd richest person in the world.

Vekselberg is close to the Kremlin. In April 2018, the United States imposed sanctions on him and 23 other Russian nationals in relation to Russia's annexation of Crimea, officially freezing up to $2 billion in assets. In March 2022, following Russia's invasion against Ukraine, the United States strengthened its sanctions and the UK, Poland and Australia also placed sanctions on Vekselberg, thereby seizing his assets and imposing a travel ban.

Early life, family and education
Viktor Vekselberg was born in 1957 to a Ukrainian Jewish father and a Russian mother in Drohobych, Ukrainian Soviet Socialist Republic (although some reports state that he was born in Lviv). All of Vekselberg’s family of seventeen fell victims to the Holocaust. They were murdered and buried in a mass grave during the Nazi repressions in Drohobych, Western Ukraine. Only Vekselberg’s father and his cousin survived the massacre. Vekselberg’s father had gone off to war, while his neighbors hid his cousin in a pit-house for almost four years. At the end of the war, she managed to flee to the territory that was controlled by the U.S. troops and later she moved to the U.S. Andrew Intrater is Vekselbergs cousin.

In 1979, he graduated from the Moscow State University of Railway Engineering. After that, he worked as a researcher and headed the laboratory of the Design Bureau for rodless pumps "Konnas".

Career
In 1988, after the Gorbachev administration relaxed restrictions on private business as part of its new policy Perestroika and Glasnost, he founded NPO Komvek which did work for the Irkutsk Aluminum Plant and in 1990, he co-founded Renova Group with college classmate, Leonard Blavatnik. KomVek owned 67% of Renova and Blavatnik's company Access Industries owned the remainder. He benefited financially from the privatization of the aluminum industry in Russia under the Yeltsin administration in 1993. In 1996, he co-founded the Siberian-Urals Aluminium Company (SUAL) via a merger of the Ural and Irkutsk Aluminum Plants. (SUAL would later be incorporated into United Company RUSAL, the largest aluminum company in the world). Using revenues generated from his aluminum business, he purchased a minority interest in Tyumen Oil (TNK), one of Russia's largest oil and gas companies. In 1997, he secured a controlling interest in Tyumen and was appointed to the board of directors; in 1998, he was appointed chairman of the board. Later, he integrated those and other assets under the umbrella of Renova Group, delegating operating responsibilities to managers.

In 2003, the Renova Group, along with Access Industries (owned by Leonard Blavatnik) and the Alfa Group (owned by Mikhail Fridman, German Khan, and Alexei Kuzmichov) announced the creation of a strategic partnership to jointly hold their oil assets in Russia and Ukraine, forming the AAR consortium. In the same year, they merged AAR with British Petroleum's Russian oil assets in a 50-50 joint venture named TNK-BP, the largest private transaction in Russian history. Acting as a chairman of the executive board of TNK, Vekselberg was instrumental in negotiating and closing the transaction.

In April 2009, Swiss Federal Finance Department initiated a criminal investigation against Vekselberg in connection to alleged violations of securities law. As a result of the investigation, Vekselberg was fined $38m by Swiss authorities.
In 2008, Vekselberg proxied a deal between Russian and Hungarian governments, buying the former embassy building from Hungary for $21m and immediately selling it to the Russian government for $116m, while the market price of the building was estimated at $50m. Investigation of the paper trail by Alexey Navalny and the Rospil project has found several invalid and backdated documents, thus suggesting a collusion (e.g. the tender held by the Hungarian side was totally fictive, as the building was already sold by that time). Hungarian officials responsible for the deal (Tátrai Miklós, Marta Horvathne Fekszi and Arpad Szekely) were detained in February 2011. On the Russian side, a criminal investigation was only started in August 2013.

In 2010, Vekselberg was appointed President of the Skolkovo Foundation, a non-profit organization funded by a mix of private investors and the Russian government, with the goal of building a technology research hub in Russia. As its president, Vekselberg signed a deal for Cisco Systems to invest $1 billion over ten years into Skolkovo Foundation projects. The Federal Bureau of Investigation subsequently issued a statement claiming that the Skolkovo Foundation was being used by the Russian government to gain access to classified American technology.

In May 2010 Vekselberg reported that he would be relocating from Zurich to the Zug canton, a region of Switzerland that still supports the lump sum tax policy which was abolished by Zurich.

In March 2017, he was offered citizenship of the Republic of Cyprus due to his investments in the country; however, a spokesperson for Vekselberg reiterated that he only had Russian citizenship.

Designation under United States sanctions programmes
Vekselberg is one of many Russian "oligarchs" named in the Countering America's Adversaries Through Sanctions Act (CAATSA) signed into law by President Donald Trump in 2017.

In March 2018, members from Robert Mueller's team of special counsel investigators questioned Vekselberg at a New York area airport.

In April 2018, the United States Department of the Treasury imposed sanctions on Vekselberg and Renova Group through designation under  ("Blocking Property of Additional Persons Contributing to the Situation in Ukraine").

A cybersecurity startup company associated with Israeli Prime Minister candidate, Benny Gantz, closed due to funds that the U.S. had frozen belonging to the subject who was an investor in Gantz's tech company, The Fifth Dimension and who was caught up in the Mueller probe of Stormy Daniel's payoff by former Trump lawyer, Michael Cohen, who had developed close ties with the subject.

In February 2021, Vekselberg complained that more than $1.5 billion of his funds were frozen in American and Swiss bank accounts and that he was not allowed to send "small amounts" to charity.

On September 1, 2022, several properties believed to be linked to Vekselberg were searched by the FBI and Deparment of Homeland Security. The inspection included an apartment in Manhattan; an estate in the Hamptons, New York; and property on Fisher Island in Florida. Officials were seen carrying boxes out of the two New York locations.

Seizure of the Motoryacht Tango

Following the 2022 Russian invasion of Ukraine, United States President Joseph R. Biden signed , "Prohibiting Certain Imports, Exports, and New Investment With Respect to Continued Russian Federation Aggression," an order of economic sanctions under the United States International Emergency Economic Powers Act. The order targeted two properties of Vekselberg worth an estimated $180 million: the an Airbus A319-115 jet and the motoryacht Tango. Estimates of the value of the Tango range from $90 million (U.S. Department of Justice estimate) to $120 million (from the website Superyachtfan.com).

In April 2022, the yacht was seized by Civil Guard of Spain and U.S. federal agents in Mallorca. A United States Department of Justice press release states that the seizure of the Tango was by request of Task Force KleptoCapture, an interagency task force operated through the United States Deputy Attorney General.

The matter is pending in the United States District Court for the District of Columbia.

Art collection
In February 2004, Vekselberg purchased nine Fabergé Imperial Easter eggs from the Forbes publishing family in New York City. The collection was transported to Russia and exhibited in the Kremlin and in Dubrovnik in 2007. Vekselberg is the single largest owner of Fabergé eggs in the world, owning fifteen of them (nine Imperial, two Kelch, and four other Fabergé eggs). In a 2013 BBC Four documentary, Vekselberg revealed that he had spent just over $100 million purchasing the nine Fabergé Imperial eggs from the Forbes collection. He claims never to have displayed them in his home, saying he bought them because they are important to Russian history and culture, and he believed them to be the best jewelry art in the world. In the same BBC documentary, Vekselberg revealed plans to open a museum to display the eggs in his collection. The result was the Fabergé Museum in Saint Petersburg, Russia, which had its official opening ceremony on November 19, 2013.

In September 2006, Vekselberg agreed to pay approximately $1 million in expenses to transport the Lowell House Bells from Harvard University in the United States back to their original location in the Danilov Monastery and to purchase replacement bells. The historic bells returned to Moscow on September 12, 2008, with the assistance of the U.S. director of the organization, Edward Mermelstein.

Vekselberg paid £1.7 million at a Christie's auction in 2005 for Odalisque, a nude said to be the work of Russian artist Boris Kustodiev. However, soon after the purchase, experts working for Vekselberg's art fund, Aurora, began to cast doubt on the picture's authenticity. They claimed that Kustodiev's signature, dated 1919, was done in aluminium-based pigment not available until after the artist's death in 1927. Vekselberg sued Christie's, and the judge ruled in July 2012 that he was entitled to recover the £1.7 million that he paid for the painting, plus Christie's was ordered to pay around £1 million in costs.

Charitable donations
Vekselberg's firm Renova donated between $50,000 and $100,000 to the Clinton Foundation.

He donated $4.5 million to the construction of the $50 million Jewish Museum and Tolerance Center in Moscow, and is the chairman of the museum's board of trustees. He finances the restoration and construction of synagogues in Russia, including the construction of the Choral Synagogue in Saratov.

In 2019, a monument was opened in Moscow to commemorate resistance heroes in concentration camps and ghettos. Vekselberg donated $300,000 to its creation.

In 2020, when the coronavirus pandemic began, Viktor Vekselberg donated 180 million rubles to buy medical equipment, personal protective equipment, and food for socially vulnerable groups of citizens.

In 2021, Russian Foreign Minister Sergey Lavrov awarded Viktor Vekselberg, among other leaders of the Russian Union of Industrialists and Entrepreneurs, for helping to bring back Russian tourists from abroad.

Personal life
He is married to Marina and has two children, a daughter and a son. His father is Jewish, and his mother Christian. He identifies himself as multi-national and does not attend weekly synagogue or church services.

Vekselberg is a longtime friend and business partner of British–American billionaire and major Republican Party donor Len Blavatnik, who is close to Israeli Prime Minister Benjamin Netanyahu.

Being placed under sanctions by President Trump's administration he names to be his personal tragedy, because he was left unable to visit his daughter and grandson in New York.

Vekselberg reportedly lives in Switzerland.

References

External links
 
 Forbes:Viktor Vekselberg
 RENOVA
 Made in Russia:Viktor Vekselberg

1957 births
Living people
BP people
Ukrainian emigrants to Russia
Ukrainian Jews
Russian art collectors
Russian billionaires
Russian businesspeople in the oil industry
Russian engineers
Russian Jews
Russian individuals subject to the U.S. Department of the Treasury sanctions
Russian individuals subject to European Union sanctions
Naturalized citizens of Cyprus
Russian oligarchs
Full Cavaliers of the Order "For Merit to the Fatherland"
Articles containing video clips
Russian businesspeople in Cyprus
Russian businesspeople in Israel